Makk is a Sudanic title meaning "king".

Makk may also refer to:

People

Károly Makk (1925–2017), Hungarian film director
Americo Makk (1927–2015), Hungarian-American painter

Acronyms

 Museum für Angewandte Kunst (Cologne)